Fominykh is a Russian surname. It may refer to the following:
 Daniil Fominykh (born 1991), Kazakh cyclist
 Maria Fominykh (born 1987), Russian chess grandmaster
 Mykola Fominykh (1927–1996), Soviet football coach

Russian-language surnames